In the Hindu epic the Mahabharata, Ashwatthama or Drauni was the son of guru Drona and Kripi (sister of Kripacharya). He was one of the most important of the characters in Mahabharata. He was the grandson of the sage Bharadwaja. Ashwatthama ruled the northern region of Panchala with Ahichhatra as his capital, being subordinate to the rulers of Hastinapura. He was a Maharathi who fought on the Kaurava side against the Pandavas in the Kurukshetra War. He became a Chiranjivi (immortal) due to a curse given to him by Krishna.

The deceptive plot of Ashwatthama's supposed death led to murder of his grieving father Drona, who was decapitated while meditating for his son's soul. He was appointed as the final commander-in-chief of the Kauravas in the Kurukshetra War. Overcome with grief and rage, he slaughtered most of the Pandava camp in a single night offensive. He was among the most prominent warriors of the Mahabharata epic, breaching multiple wartime rules of conduct and morality with his egregious employment of divine weapons.

Etymology 

According to The Mahabharata, Ashwatthama means "the sacred voice which relates to that of a horse". It is so-called because when he was born he cried like a horse.

Some of the patryomics are Dronaputra-He was referred to as "Dronaputra" as he was son of Dronacharya, Guruputra-Kauravas and Pandavas used to call him "Guruputra" as he was their guru's son and Kripi Kumara-His mother's name was Kripi.

Birth and life prior to the war 

Ashwatthama is the son of Drona and Kripi. He was born in a cave in a forest (in present-day Tapkeshwar Mahadev Temple, Dehradun, Uttarakhand). Drona does many years of severe penance to please Lord Shiva in order to obtain a son who possesses the same valiance as Lord Shiva.

Ashwatthama is born with a gem on his forehead which gives him power over all living beings lower than humans; it protects him from hunger, thirst, and fatigue. Though an expert in warfare, Drona lives a simple life, with little money or property. As a result, Ashwatthama has a difficult childhood, with his family unable to even afford milk. Wanting to provide a better life for his family, Drona goes to the Panchal Kingdom to seek aid from his former classmate and friend, Drupada. However, Drupada rebukes the friendship, claiming a king and a beggar cannot be friends, humiliating Drona.

After this incident, and seeing the plight of Drona, Kripa invites Drona to Hastinapur. Thus, Drona becomes the guru of both the Pandavas and Kauravas. Ashwatthama is trained in the art of warfare along with them.

Later, Drona asked his disciples to give him his Dakṣiṇā; requesting the capture of Drupada. While the Kauravas failed, the Pandavas defeated Drupada and presented him before Drona. Drona took the northern half of Drupada's kingdom, crowning Ashwatthama as king of it. Ahichhatra was Ashwatthama’s capital.

Role in the Kurukshetra war 
Since Hastinapura, ruled by King Dhritarashtra, offered Drona the privilege of teaching the Kuru princes, both Drona and Ashwatthama are loyal to Hastinapur and fight for the Kauravas in the Kurukshetra war. Before Dronacharya's death, Ashwatthama visits his father, desiring a blessing of victory that he is denied. Drona advises Ashwatthama to win the war using his own strength and not through a blessing.

On the 14th day of the war, he kills a division of Rakshasas including Anjanaparvan (son of Ghatotkacha). He also stands against Arjuna several times, trying to prevent him from reaching Jayadratha, though is unsuccessful.

Death of Drona 

On the 10th day of the war, after Bhishma falls, Drona is named the supreme commander of the armies. He promises Duryodhana that he will capture Yudhishthira, but then he repeatedly fails to do so. Duryodhana taunts and insults him, which greatly angers Ashwatthama, causing friction between Ashwatthama and Duryodhana. Krishna knows that it was not possible to defeat an armed Drona. So, Krishna suggests to Yudhishthira and the other Pandavas, that if Drona were convinced that his son was killed on the battlefield, then his grief would leave him vulnerable to attack.

Krishna hatches a plan for Bhima to kill an elephant by the name Ashwatthama while claiming to Drona it was Drona's son who was dead. Ultimately, the gambit works (though the details of it vary depending on the version of the Mahabharata), and Dhrishtadyumna beheads the grieving sage.

Narayanastra usage 
After learning of the deceptive way his father was killed, Ashwatthama becomes filled with wrath and invokes the Narayanastra, against the Pandavas.

When the weapon is invoked, violent winds begin to blow, peals of thunder are heard, and an arrow appears for every Pandava soldier. Knowing that the astra ignores unarmed persons, Krishna's instructs all the troops to abandon their chariots, disarm, and surrender to the weapon. After getting their soldiers to disarm (including Bhima with some difficulty), the astra passes by harmlessly. When urged by Duryodhana to use the weapon again, desirous of victory, Ashwatthama sadly responds that if the weapon is used again, it will turn on its user.

In some versions of the story, like the Neelakantha Chaturdhara compilation, the Narayanastra destroys one Akshauhini of the Pandava army completely. After the use of Narayanastra, a terrible war between both armies takes place. Ashwatthama defeats Dhrishtadyumna in direct combat, but failed to kill him as Satyaki and Bhima cover his retreat.

16th Day War 
By using an ordinary bow Ashwatthama fired millions of arrows at a time which resulted in the stupefaction of Arjuna himself. Then after some time he again overpowered Arjuna as Lord Krishna and Arjuna were bathed in blood but at last Arjuna pierced his steeds and steeds carried Ashwatthama away and also his weapons were exhausted.
King Malayadhwaja of Pandya Kingdom was one of the mightiest warrior of Pandavas and on that day he fought brilliantly against Ashwatthama. After a long duel of Archery between them Ashwatthama made Malayadhwaja carless, weaponless and had obtained an opportunity to kill him on the spot but he spared him temporarily for more fight.Then Malayadhwaja proceeded against Ashwatthama on an elephant and sped a powerful lance which destroyed latter's diadem.Then Ashwathama cut off the head and arms of Malayadhwaja and also killed 6 followers of Malayadhwaja. All the great warriors of Kauravas then applauded him for his act.

Becoming commander 

After the terrible death of Dushasana, Ashwatthama suggests Duryodhana make peace with the Pandavas, keeping in mind the welfare of Hastinapur. Later, after Duryodhana is struck down by Bhima and facing death, the last three survivors from the Kaurava side, Ashwatthama, Kripa, and Kritvarma rush to his side. Ashwatthama swears to bring Duryodhana revenge, and Duryodhana appoints him as the commander-in-chief.

Attack on Pandava Camp 

Along with Kripa and Kritavarma, Ashwatthama plans to attack the Pandavas camp at night.

Ashwatthama first kicks and awakens Dhrishtadyumna, the commander of the Pandava army and the killer of his father. Ashwatthama strangles the half-awake Dhrishtadyumna by choking him to death as the prince begs to be allowed to die with a sword in his hand. Ashwatthama proceeds with butchering the remaining warriors, including the Upapandavas, Shikhandi, Yudhamanyu, Uttamaujas, and many other prominent warriors of the Pandava army. Even as some soldiers try and fight back, Ashwatthama remains unharmed due to his activated abilities as one of the eleven Rudras. Those who try to flee from Ashwatthama's wrath are hacked down by Kripacharya and Kritavarma at the camp's entrances.

After the slaughter, the three warriors go to find Duryodhana. After relaying to him the deaths of all the Panchalas, they announce that the Pandavas have no sons with whom to rejoice their victory. Duryodhana felt greatly satisfied and avenged at Ashwatthama's ability to do for him what Bhishma, Drona, and Karna could not. With this, Duryodhana breathes his last, and mourning, the three remaining members of the Kaurava army perform the cremation rites.

Aftermath of the attack 

The Pandavas and Krishna who were away during the night, now return to their camp the next day morning. Hearing the news of these events Yudhishthira faints and the Pandavas become inconsolable. Bhima angrily rushes to kill Drona's son. They find him at sage Vyasa's ashram near the bank of Bhagiratha.

The now triggered Ashwatthama invokes the Brahmastra against the Pandavas to fulfill the oath of killing them. Krishna asks Arjuna to fire the Brahmashirā, the anti-missile, against Ashwatthama to defend themselves. Vyasa intervenes and prevents the weapons from clashing against each other. He asks both Arjuna and Ashwatthama to take their weapons back. Arjuna, knowing how to do so takes it back.

Ashwatthama not knowing the process to retrieve the Brahmastra, instead directs the weapon towards the womb of the pregnant Uttara (Arjuna's daughter-in-law) in an attempt to end the lineage of the Pandavas.

Krishna saves Uttara's unborn child from the effects of Brahmastra, on the request of Draupadi, Subhadra and Sudeshna. As the child faced a test of life even before being born, Lord Sri Krishna named him Parikshit (literally: "the tested one") and later on this child succeeds Yudhisthira to become the next king of Hastinapura. Ashwatthama was then made to surrender the gem on his forehead and cursed by Krishna for 3000 years that he will roam in the forests with blood and puss oozing out of his injuries and cry for death but death would not meet him.

Lineage 
A theory is propounded by historians R. Sathianathaier and D. C. Sircar, with endorsements by Hermann Kulke, Dietmar Rothermund and Burton Stein. Sircar points out that the family legends of the Pallavas speak of an ancestor descending from Ashwatthama and his union with a Naga princess. It was the son born from this union, that would have started this dynasty. This claim finds support in the fact that Kanchipuram was where the Pallavas would dwell, and this was earlier a part of the Naga Kingdom.

A further corroboration is that the gotra of the Pālave Maratha family is Bharadwaja (grandfather of Ashwatthama), same as the one which Pallavas have attributed to themselves in their records.

There is a shrine for Ashwatthama in the famous Ananthapadmanabhaswamy temple of Thiruvanthapuram.

In popular culture 
In Sri Krishna Satya, M. Prabhakar Reddy played the role of Ashwatthama.
In Mahabharat (1988 TV series), Pradeep Rawat (actor) acted as Ashwatthama.
In Krishna (TV series),Mukul Nag acted as Ashwatthama.
 In 2013 version of the Mahabharata, Ashwatthama was portrayed by Ankit Mohan.
In the TV show Suryaputra Karn, Kunal Bakshi acted as Ashwatthama.
In  Dharmakshetra, Ashwatthama was portrayed by Saurabh Goyal.
In Kurukshetra (2019 film), Ashwatthama was portrayed by Bharat Gowda.
In Ek Aur Mahabharat,Ashwathama was portrayed by Ashok Lokhande.

Literature

The Sapta Chiranjivi Stotram is a mantra that is featured in Hindu literature:

The mantra states that the remembrance of the eight immortals (Ashwatthama, Mahabali, Vyasa, Hanuman, Vibhishana, Kripa, Parashurama, and Markandaya) offers one freedom from ailments and longevity.

Incidents of meeting Ashwatthama 
Ashwatthama is believed to be alive even today. There are some incidents of several people meeting him.

1. Ashwathama has been seen by Railway Employees.
An article in one of the newspapers that is more than a decade old features a railroad employee who is on leave and on vacation.

While he was on vacation and strolling in the forests of Navsari, Gujarat, this train employee reported seeing a very tall man with a head wound.

He claimed to have spoken to her and learned that Bhima was much taller and stronger than him. (Also read 19 Awatara Dewa Shiva)

2. Ashwathama meeting with the sage Naranappa
Naranappa wrote his version of Mahabharata with the help of Ashwathama. The Mahabharata ends with Gadaa Parwa. It is said that Naranappa met Ashwattama and asked for help to write Mahabharata in Kannada (Kannada Version).

Ashwatthama agreed with the conditions. He will start writing Mahabharata every day after he cleans himself. He had to wear wet dothi (brahman clothing). The Mahabharata story will continue to flow into his hands until the dothi he uses is dry. He must not tell this secret to others. (Also read Mahabharata Adiparwa Chapter 9: Curse of Parashurama)

Long story short, when he's writing reached Gada Parva, the story of Bhima and Duryodhana's fight, he happily shared this secret with his wife. From then on, the Mahabharata story stopped at Gada Parva.

3. Aswathama meets Swaminarayan's parents
Dharmdeva and Bhaktimaataa (Swaminarayan's father and mother) were cursed more than two hundred years ago by Ashwatthaamaa. This is explained in the Satsangi Jivan written by Shatanand Muni. (Also read Dashavatara 10 Awatara Wisnu)

When they got lost in the forest and they met someone – He was tall and tall in an orange robe as a Brahmin. When they told the brahmins about Ka they told them Ka would be born as their son. The brahmana angrily called Krishna his enemy and cursed them.

4. Aswathama Seen in Ludhiana, Punjab
Around 1968–1969: A doctor described an incident meeting a person who had an injured forehead. He had never seen such a wound as if his brain had been removed from his forehead, yet his skin was tight as if nothing had happened. By the time the doctor tried to get his belongings from the tool cabinet, the man was gone and was never found again. But he said his blue eyes were always in his shadow.

5. Aswathama seen near the river Narmada (Gujarat)
Many people have seen someone with a wound on his forehead roaming around the river Narmada (Gujarat). He is described as a tall person, and there are lots of flies and insects that surround him all the time.

6. Vasudevanand Saraswati Met Ashwatthama at Shoolpaneeshawar
Vasudevanand Saraswati, a brahmin who was considered to be the incarnation of Dattatreya by their followers, saw Ashwatthama in the dense forest of Shoolpaneeshawar near Katarkheda, in 1912.

It is said that Vasudevanand Saraswati got lost in the forest. In the middle of the forest, they met a tall brahmin. They were escorted out of the forest by this brahmin. When they approached the edge of the forest, the brahmin said he could only lead them here. When asked by Vasudevan, “Who are you, your body is not a normal human body. Are you a ghost or a yaksha? Introduce yourself. ”

The brahmin replied, “You are right, all of that is true, everything looks abnormal. Because I'm not from this yuga. I come from Dwapara Yuga. I am Ashwatthama. ”

7. Pilot Baba meets Ashwatthama in person
Pilot Baba is an Indian spiritual teacher who was previously Commander Wing Kapil Singh, a fighter pilot in the Indian Air Force. Baba's pilots have established a number of Ashrams and spiritual centers in India and abroad.

Pilot Baba recounts the events of Ashwathama's meeting and has a detailed conversation with him.

8. Ashwatthama can often be seen at the Old Fort Asirgarha fort
It is said that Ashwathama settled around the Asirgarh fort for the last 5000 years. And he worships Lord Shiva at the fort shrine early in the morning. What is still a mystery is that every morning fresh flowers and sandals are dedicated to Lord Shiva. It is believed that he was the first devotee of the day.

People associated with the area tell a myth that sometimes Ashwathama is seen at night and stays around Asirgarha Fort. And sometimes ask for turmeric and oil to stop the blood on his forehead. He bathed in the ponds around the fort and worshiped Lord Shiva at the Citadel shrine.

9. Ashwattama seen in Lilotinath Mandir Lakhimpur Kheri temple, Utar Pradesh
Locals have seen Ashwathama several times at this temple. People also tell about flowers  on Shivalinga in the morning. 

10. Ashwathama meeting with Prithviraj Chauhan.

A myth of that ashwathama is seen at night and stays around asirgarha fort and worships Lord Shiva everyday in very early morning.  people says that no one has Courage to Inside asirgarha fort at night .  Once Prithviraj Chauhan went to hide in Asirgarh Fort to hide from his enemy(Muhammad Ghori's) at night . And that night he saw a very big man standing in front of him whose head is continuously bleeding and flet very strange. After seeing him prithvi sure that he was standing in front of the great warrior  ashwathama . Then prithvi learn a technique of (शब्दभेदी  बाण ). Rest of history knows .

References

External links 

Original text online 
 GRETIL etext  (Muneo Tokunaga)
 Mahābhārata online
 History: Encounters with Ashvatthama

Chiranjivins
Characters in the Mahabharata